An all-you-can-eat restaurant (AYCE) is a type of restaurant in which a fixed price is charged for entry, after which diners may consume as much food as they wish. All-you-can-eat establishments are frequently buffets.

Buffets 

The all-you-can-eat buffet has been ascribed to Herbert "Herb" Cobb McDonald, a Las Vegas publicity and entertainment manager who introduced the idea in 1946. In his 1965 novel The Muses of Ruin, William Pearson wrote of the buffet:

A 2011 study showed that the actual amount of food consumed increases with the price charged for the buffet.

Other restaurants 

The all-you-can-eat business model is also prevalent in Korean barbecue and Chinese hot pot restaurants, as well as in Brazilian churrascarias.

Beverages 

When applied to beverages, particularly alcoholic beverages, the unlimited model is known as "all-you-can-drink" or "bottomless" (as in "bottomless brunch" or "bottomless mimosas").

References 

Restaurants by type